"The Remedy for a Broken Heart (Why Am I So in Love)" (stylized in all lowercase) is a song by American rapper and singer XXXTentacion from his second studio album ? (2018). It was written by XXXTentacion and produced by XXXTentacion and John Cunningham.

Composition
The song contains an acoustic sound blending with trap elements, "morose 808s", and a looped sample of XXXTentacion's vocals, of the lyrics "Why am I so in love? I don't know why". X reflects on his past relationship with his ex-girlfriend Geneva Ayala, revolving around how his love for her is unrequited, while the "remedy" for his broken heart is presumably his girlfriend Jenesis Sanchez, with X singing, "I, oh, I, am fallin' for you, fallin' for you".

Critical reception
The song received generally positive reviews. Kevin Goddard of HotNewHipHop wrote that "X shows off his impressive wordplay and effortless flow" in the song.

Charts

Certifications

References

2018 songs
XXXTentacion songs
Songs written by XXXTentacion